Tutuban station is a proposed Manila Light Rail Transit (LRT) station situated on Line 2. It is part of the Line 2 West Extension project, a  extension from Recto station to the Manila North Harbor in Tondo. The west extension project calls for the construction of three additional elevated stations: two on Recto Avenue and one on Mel Lopez Boulevard near Pier 4 of the Manila North Harbor. It was approved by the National Economic and Development Authority on May 19, 2015.

The station would be the first for trains headed west from Recto and the eleventh for trains headed from Antipolo. It would be located next to the Tutuban Center Mall near the intersection of Recto Avenue with Abad Santos Avenue 20 meters away, leading to the Tutuban railway station, connecting Line 2 with the PNR Metro Commuter Line and in the future with the PNR North-South Commuter Rail.

Currently, the station is in the planning stages.

Nearby landmarks
When completed, the station will be connected to Tutuban Center, Tutuban station of the Philippine National Railways, Divisoria Shopping Mall, 168 Shopping Mall, 999 Mall, Lucky Chinatown, CityPlace Square, and other commercial establishments in the market district of Divisoria and Binondo.

References

Manila Light Rail Transit System stations
Proposed railway stations in the Philippines